FS Canis Majoris (FS CMa), also known as HD 45677 or MWC 142, is a B-type star in the constellation of Canis Major. It has an apparent visual magnitude of approximately 8.50, having varied between magnitudes 7.35 and 8.58. Feinstein and colleagues reported in 1976 that it had decreased by 0.9 magnitude between 1969 and 1976, whereas it had only varied by 0.3 magnitude in the 70 years beforehand. Sometimes it could vary by up to 0.5 magnitude in a year or 0.1 magnitude in a night, and there did not appear to be any regular period to its variability.

Astronomer Anatoly Miroshnichenko has made it the prototype of a new type of variable star, the FS Canis Majoris variables. These are hot blue-white stars that exhibit forbidden line emission and strong infra-red excess suggestive of very young (pre-main-sequence) stars yet they do not lie in star-forming regions. Nor did they appear to be stars that had evolved off the main sequence into giant or supergiant stars. It is now thought that they are main-sequence stars that have absorbed or are absorbing matter, most likely from a companion star, and are surrounded by a compact dusty shell. These stars are thought to be significant contributors to interstellar dust. FS Canis Majoris has been well studied due to its dusty disk, which is inclined 51° relative to the plane of sky. The disk has a gap within 5 au of the star.

Its spectral type has been previously classified as B2III to B2V and its bolometric magnitude as -4.89. However, investigation of its spectrum in 2006 showed that FS Canis Majoris is a binary system. The system is between 1,250 and 8,000 times as luminous as the Sun. One calculation has the masses of the primary and secondary at 9.3 ± 0.5 and 4.8 ± 0.9 solar masses and radii 6.6 ± 0.5 and 2.9 ± 0.6 times that of the Sun, and surface temperatures of 21,600 ± 350 and 16,380 ± 1,670 K, respectively.

References

Canis Major
B-type main-sequence stars
045677
030800
Canis Majoris, FS
FS Canis Majoris variables
Shell stars
Binary stars
Durchmusterung objects